Chip 1 Exchange, is a privately owned, independent distributor of electronic components headquartered in Neu-Isenburg, Germany. Chip 1 is among the top 10 independent electronic distributors in Europe and has an established presence around the world. Operations are based in Germany, USA, Mexico, Brazil, and the Philippines.

History
Chip 1 Exchange was established in 2001, when electronic industry veterans Sasan Tabib, Damon Pouya, and Volkan Sanverdi merged their companies, Fast Line Exchange and Chip 1 Technology. Since its inception, Chip 1 Exchange has opened 6 additional branches and cater to original equipment manufacturers and electronic manufacturing service companies. In addition to being an independent distributor, Chip-1 also offers franchised lines from electronic component manufacturers.

Locations
China: 19C, Tower A, Xiandaizhichuang Building, Huaqiang North Road 1078, Futian District, Shenzhen, China  
Germany: Martin-Behaim-Strasse 10 63263 Neu-Isenburg, Germany  
USA (Headquarters): 701 Eight Twenty Blvd, Fort Worth, TX 76106   
USA (Regional Sales Office): 23422 Mill Creek Dr, Laguna Hills, CA 92653  
Mexico: San Antonio 68 Col. Las Fuentes Zapopan, Jalisco, Mexico 45070  
Brazil
Philippines: Unit 902B Tektite West Tower Exchange Road Ortigas Center Pasig 1605

Quality and Certifications
Chip 1 Exchange is ISO 9001:2008 certified and a member of electronic industry organizations such as the ERAI and C.O.G.

References

 Chip 1 at the Electronica International Trade Show
 SMTOnline.com Editorial
 3cx.com
 Powerpulse.net Article

External links
 
 Chip 1 Report
 

Electronic component distributors
Industrial supply companies
Electronics companies of Germany
Electronics companies established in 2001
Companies based in Hesse